Guillermo Gerardo Carreño Matamala (born February 6, 1962, in Chile) is a former Chilean footballer who played for clubs of Chile.

Career
In 1984, he was on loan to Cobreandino. In the years 1985 to 1988 in Iquique, where it reached its greatest footballing expression.
Hires Colo-Colo in 1989, wearing the dawn shirt until 1990 and the "cacique" won the National Tournament in 1989 and 1990 and Chile Glass of them years. In 1991, he played in O'Higgins of Rancagua, where he played until 1993, when he retired.

Chile national team 
He played for the youth team of Chile. In 1983, he joined the senior national team, which competed in the IX Pan American Games in Caraca, Venezuela. He was also selected adult 1988 and 1989. Records in its statistical two games.

Teams
  Unión Española 1980-1983
  Trasandino 1984
  Deportes Iquique 1985-1988
  Colo-Colo 1989-1990
  O'Higgins 1991-1993

Titles
  Colo-Colo 1989 and 1990 (Chilean Primera División Championship and Copa Chile)

References

1962 births
Living people
Chilean footballers
Colo-Colo footballers
Trasandino footballers
Deportes Iquique footballers
O'Higgins F.C. footballers
Unión Española footballers
Chilean Primera División players
Association footballers not categorized by position